Aron Winter (born 1 March 1967) is a Dutch former professional football midfielder and manager for Suriname. He has played for Ajax and Sparta Rotterdam in the Netherlands, for Italian sides Lazio and Inter Milan, and for the Netherlands national team.

Club career

Ajax
Winter began his career with amateur club VV Unicum in Lelystad, moved on to SV Lelystad, and the same year joined Ajax at the age of 19. His first game for Ajax was a match against FC Utrecht on 6 April 1986, which Ajax won 3–0. Winter won two KNVB Cups (1987 and 1988), the Eredivisie title (1990), the European Cup Winners' Cup (1987) and the UEFA Cup (1992).

Lazio
In 1992, he moved to the Roman team Lazio, playing his first match against Sampdoria on 6 September, which Lazio tied 3–3.

Inter Milan
In 1996, Winter joined Inter Milan, with whom he won the UEFA Cup in 1998. He had also played in the previous year's final, with the game going to penalties. However, Winter missed his penalty as Inter lost to Schalke.

Ajax return and Sparta Rotterdam loan
Winter left Inter for his former club Ajax in 1999. In 2001, he was loaned out to Sparta Rotterdam. He played 32 games for Sparta Rotterdam and scored one goal before returning to Ajax to finish his career, and where he chose to retire in 2003.

International career
Winter was a member of the Dutch national team that won the 1988 European Football Championship, but made no appearances during the final tournament.

He played in 1990 Italy World Cup where the Netherlands lost in 1/8 finals game against Germany. In the 1994 FIFA World Cup, he scored a goal against Brazil in the quarter-finals, making him the only player of Indian descent ever to score in a World Cup.

He was also selected for the Dutch national team for Euro 96, as well as the 1998 FIFA World Cup in France.

Winter placed in Rijkaard's Euro 2000 squad.

Having represented his national team 84 times, scoring 6 goals, Winter is currently the twelfth most capped player for the Dutch national team.

Style of play
Normally a central or holding midfielder, Winter was a hard-working and physical, yet elegant and classy team player of both quantity and quality. Owing to his development in the Ajax youth system, which was heavily influenced by the Dutch total football tactical philosophy, Winter was a versatile and well–rounded midfielder, who was capable of assisting his team both defensively and offensively, as well as creatively, courtesy of his physical, technical, and tactical qualities. Among his range of skills, he possessed significant stamina, acceleration, physicality, a good positional sense, intelligence, vision, passing, technique, and excellent striking ability from distance, as well as an ability to make late runs into the penalty box. Beyond his playing ability, he was known for his strong character, personality, consistency, composed playing style, correct behaviour, and leadership qualities, which made him a respected figure among his clubs' fans and teammates. In Italy, his best role was considered to be that of a left–sided central, offensive–minded box-to-box midfielder, known as the mezzala role in Italian football jargon, although he was also capable of playing on the right in a three–player midfield in a 4–3–3, a role in which he was often used during his time at Lazio. He would often start matches out wide before moving into the centre of the pitch. Moreover, he was also deployed on either the right or left flank, as a wide midfielder, wing-back, or full-back, in particular during his time with Inter; however these were not his favoured positions, and Italian pundits did not consider him to be as well–suited to these roles due to his less convincing performances. Winter was also occasionally used to great effect as a centre-back under manager Guus Hiddink with the Dutch national team, with Elko Born of Bleacher Report even ranking him as the eight–best Dutch central defender of all time in 2014.

Managerial career
After three years as assistant coach for the Ajax first academy team, Winter signed a three-year contract with Canadian side Toronto FC on 6 January 2011. Winter brought former colleague Bob de Klerk from Ajax to be his assistant coach, while Paul Mariner was also brought in the same day as Director of Player Development. After a disappointing season opener against Vancouver Whitecaps that ended in a 4–2 away defeat on 19 March, Winter won his first game as Toronto's head coach the following week against Portland Timbers 2–0 in Toronto.

Winter won his first trophy with Toronto in early July as Toronto defeated Vancouver 3–2 on aggregate to capture its third consecutive Canadian Championship, thereby earning a berth in the 2011–12 CONCACAF Champions League.  Winter then guided Toronto to the Champions League semifinals, the first time a Canadian club had progressed that far in the competition. Toronto eventually lost 7–3 on aggregate to Santos Laguna.

However, Toronto began the 2012 MLS season with nine straight losses, the worst start to a season in the history of the MLS. Toronto won its tenth match 1–0 versus Philadelphia on 26 May 2012, but it was not enough to save Winter's job, as the club announced on 7 June 2012 that he would be replaced by the director of player development, Paul Mariner.

On 6 September 2022, Winter was announced as the interim coach for Suriname. Winter succeeds Stanley Menzo, who was at the helm of the team for seven months before leaving to work at Beijing Guoan. Winter is set to coach Natio in a friendly against Nicaragua and a potential second opponent.

Personal life
Winter was born in Paramaribo, Suriname. His cousin Ricardo Winter was also a former football player/manager who headed the Suriname national football team.

Managerial statistics

Honours

Player
Ajax
Eredivisie: 1989–90
KNVB Cup: 1986–87
European Cup Winners' Cup: 1986–87
UEFA Cup: 1991–92

Inter Milan
UEFA Cup: 1997–98

Netherlands
UEFA European Championship: 1988

Individual
Dutch Young Player of the Year: 1986

Manager
Toronto FC
Canadian Championship: 2011, 2012

Ajax (as assistant manager)
Eredivisie: 2018–19
KNVB Cup: 2018–19

Career statistics

Club
Source:

See also
 List of MLS coaches
 2001–02 Sparta Rotterdam season

References

External links

1967 births
Living people
Sportspeople from Paramaribo
Surinamese people of Indian descent
Surinamese emigrants to the Netherlands
Dutch people of Indian descent
Sportspeople of Indian descent
Dutch footballers
Dutch expatriate footballers
Netherlands international footballers
AFC Ajax players
S.S. Lazio players
Inter Milan players
Sparta Rotterdam players
Eredivisie players
Serie A players
Expatriate footballers in Italy
Expatriate soccer managers in Canada
Association football midfielders
UEFA Euro 1988 players
1990 FIFA World Cup players
UEFA Euro 1992 players
1994 FIFA World Cup players
UEFA Euro 1996 players
1998 FIFA World Cup players
UEFA Euro 2000 players
UEFA European Championship-winning players
AFC Ajax non-playing staff
Jong Ajax managers
Toronto FC coaches
UEFA Cup winning players
Dutch expatriate sportspeople in Italy
Dutch expatriate sportspeople in Canada
Dutch football managers